Thunai Mudhalvar is a 2015 Indian Tamil political satire film written by K. Bhagyaraj and directed by R. Vivekanandan. The film stars Jayaram in the lead roles while Shweta Menon, Bhagyaraj and Sandhya among others form an ensemble cast. Music for the film was composed by four different music directors and the film opened to negative reviews in April 2015.

Cast

 Jayaram as Chinna Paandi
 Sandhya as Rukmani
 Swetha Menon as Thangam
 K. Bhagyaraj as Periya Pandi 
 Junior Balaiah
 Tarun Kumar
 Mohan Raman
 Kovai Senthil
 Nellai Siva
 Manobala
 T. P. Gajendran
 Ranganathan
 Sembuli Jagan
 Gowtham (vijith)
 Koshr
 Raju Jeyamohan

Production
During the audio launch of Bharathiraja's Annakodi (2013) in January 2013, Bhagyaraj announced that he was working a script titled Thunai Mudhalvar Unopposed and that he was finalising the cast for the project. The film was launched in December 2013, with Jayaram signed on to appear alongside Bhagyaraj in the lead roles, while newcomer Vivekanandan would handle the film's direction. Shweta Menon was also signed on, marking her fourth film in the Tamil film industry, as was Meenakshi, and the team began shoot in Pollachi.

Bhagyaraj "ghost-directed" the film, often changing the script and dialogues of the film on location. Meenakshi later opted out of the project and was replaced by Sandhya, who played Jayaram's wife in the film.

Soundtrack
Music composed by Jai; Balaji; PradeepHarish-Jai.

Release
The film opened to negative reviews in April 2015, with a critic from The Hindu noting it "is an outdated film that verges on the obscene" and that "its plot, its setting, its pace, its depiction of women — is dated". Likewise, a critic from The Times of India noted "the whole enterprise feels like some badly made TV serial", particularly criticizing the film's depiction of women.

References

2015 films
2010s Tamil-language films
Indian political satire films
Films with screenplays by K. Bhagyaraj
2015 directorial debut films